Vasile Laszlo Miriuță (born 19 September 1968) is a football manager and former player. From December 2020, he was the head coach of Liga III side Minaur Baia Mare, until July 2021. From July 2021 he was enrolled as the technical director of the same team, Minaur.

Born in Romania, the midfielder played nine matches for the Hungary national team, in which he scored one goal in a friendly on 21 August 2002 against Spain. Famous for his free kicks and tactical cleverness, he promoted in the Bundesliga with Energie Cottbus in 2000, but was released at the end of 2002. Most of his time at MSV Duisburg he spent outside the starting eleven.

Club career
Miriuță debuted as a player in 1988 for FCM Baia Mare. In 1990, he was signed by Dinamo București. At Dinamo, Miriuță became an undisputed regular, until new coach Florin Halagian allegedly told him that he's not going to play a single game in his term, prompting him to leave for Gloria Bistrița in 1991. After one season at Gloria, he returned at Dinamo.

Hungary
In 1992, tired with his status as a substitute at Dinamo, Miriuță signed with Hungarian side Győr. He soon became a popular figure among the supporters. In 1993, Miriuță was signed by French side Bourges, but returns to Győr after only one season. In 1996, Miriuță moved to Videoton, but after playing four games and scoring three goals for the Székesfehérvár club, he is signed by Ferencváros. After two years at Ferencváros, Miriuță signed with rivals Újpest, but did not play on league games for the Purples.

Energie Cottbus
In 1998, Miriuța signed with 2. Bundesliga side Energie Cottbus. He soon became undisputed regular for the club and helped the team avoid relegation in the Regionalliga Nordost in his first season for the club. In 2000, Miriuță promoted in Bundesliga with Cottbus, and during their first season in the top tier became one of the regulars of the famous all-foreign line-up. He scored 12 goals in Bundesliga in the 2000–01 season and was voted into the Bundesliga Best XI. Despite this, Miriuță was released in 2002.

Late career
In 2002, he signed with 2. Bundesliga side MSV Duisburg, but was mostly used as a substitute.

In 2003, Miriuță returned to Győr for the third time in his career, for a season. In 2004, he signed with Budapest Honvéd, but ended his contract following a dispute with the coach, then retired.

International career
In 2000, Miriuță received a phone call from a messenger of Prime Minister Viktor Orbán announcing him that he obtained Hungarian citizenship, for which he applied in 1994, and asking him to play for the national team. He made his debut for Hungary in a 1–0 friendly win over Macedonia.

In three years playing for Hungary, Miriuță earned 9 caps and scored a goal in a 1–1 friendly draw against Spain.

Career statistics
Scores and results list Hungary's goal tally first, score column indicates score after each Miriuță goal.

Managerial statistics

Honours

Manager
Minaur Baia Mare
Liga III: 2020–21

References

External links
 
 
  (archive)

1968 births
Living people
Sportspeople from Baia Mare
Hungarian people of Romanian descent
Hungarian footballers
Association football midfielders
Hungary international footballers
Ferencvárosi TC footballers
Újpest FC players
Győri ETO FC players
Budapest Honvéd FC players
FC Dinamo București players
CS Minaur Baia Mare (football) players
ACF Gloria Bistrița players
FC Energie Cottbus players
MSV Duisburg players
Bourges 18 players
Liga I players
Liga III players
Nemzeti Bajnokság I players
Ligue 2 players
Bundesliga players
2. Bundesliga players
Hungarian expatriate footballers
Expatriate footballers in Germany
Expatriate footballers in France
Hungarian expatriate sportspeople in Germany
Hungarian expatriate sportspeople in France
Romanian expatriate sportspeople in Germany
Romanian expatriate sportspeople in France
Hungarian football managers
Expatriate football managers in Germany
3. Liga managers
CSM Ceahlăul Piatra Neamț managers
CFR Cluj managers
Győri ETO FC managers
ASA 2013 Târgu Mureș managers
FC Energie Cottbus managers
CS Concordia Chiajna managers
FC Dinamo București managers
FC Hermannstadt managers
Kisvárda FC managers
CS Minaur Baia Mare (football) managers
Nemzeti Bajnokság I managers